Aurore von Haxthausen (Gustava Charlotta Märta Aurora: 1830 in Daretorp in Västergötland – 7 February 1888 in Stockholm), known also by her artist pseudonym as Klara Kuhlman, was a Swedish author, composer, pianist and lady in waiting.

History 
She was the daughter of the State Councillor ( swedish: statsråd ) and Governor ( swedish: landshövding ) of Halland County, Baron Carl Henrik Gyllenhaal and Aurore af Nordin and married in 1873 to the Danish noble at the Danish legation in Stockholm, Frederik Ferdinand von Haxthausen.

From 1857 until 1871, she was a favored maid of honor and confidante of the Swedish queen, Louise of the Netherlands. She was known at court for her wittiness and talent for cheering people up as well as for her piano improvisations: a typical episode of all these qualities was when she, at one occasion when Louisa had reprimanded a chamber maid, eased the tension by improvising the whole episode on piano.

Aurore von Haxthausen wrote several compositions for piano which was given on public concerts: one of them was, for several years, often played during the annual opening of parliament. She also published a collection of novels: Från svenska hem (1883–84).

Selected works
Från svenska hem: pennritningar / af Klara Kuhlmann. Stockholm: Seligmann. 1883. Libris 1597523 (Swedish language)
Från svenska hem: pennritningar : ny samling / af Klara Kuhlmann. Stockholm: Seligmann. 1884. Libris 1597524 (Swedish language)

References
 http://www.ub.gu.se/fasta/laban/erez/kvinnohistoriska/tidskrifter/idun/1888/pdf/1888_10.pdf
 Haxthausen, Gustava Charlotta Märta Aurora von, in Nordisk familjebok (1909)

Further reading 
 

1830 births
1888 deaths
19th-century classical composers
19th-century Swedish women writers
19th-century Swedish writers
People from Västergötland
Swedish classical composers
Swedish classical pianists
Swedish women pianists
Swedish pianists
Swedish ladies-in-waiting
Women classical composers
19th-century classical pianists
Swedish women composers
19th-century Swedish musicians
Women classical pianists
19th-century Swedish women musicians
19th-century women composers
19th-century women pianists